Ivan “Judo” Gene LeBell (October 9, 1932 – August 9, 2022) was an American martial artist, stunt performer, actor, and professional wrestler. Nicknamed "The Godfather of Grappling", he popularized grappling in professional fighting circles, serving as a precursor to modern mixed martial arts. He worked on over 1,000 films and TV shows and authored 12 books.

In 2000, the United States Ju-Jitsu Federation (USJJF) promoted LeBell to 9th dan in jujitsu and taihojutsu. On August 7, 2004, the World Martial Arts Masters Association promoted him to 10th degree. In February 2005, the USJJF made him 9th dan in judo.

LeBell has been reported as the inspiration for the character of Cliff Booth (Brad Pitt) in Quentin Tarantino's Once Upon a Time in Hollywood. However, Tarantino disputes this claim.

Early life
Ivan Gene LeBell was born in Los Angeles, California. He started training in catch wrestling and boxing from his early childhood, influenced by his mother, "Red Head" Aileen Eaton, a promoter of both sports who owned the Olympic Auditorium in Los Angeles. LeBell took up catch wrestling under Ed "Strangler" Lewis at age 7, and later moved to train in judo. After getting his black belt, he went to Japan to train in judo at the Kodokan.

Career

Early career
After returning to the United States, LeBell competed as a heavyweight. In 1954 and 1955, while only 22 years of age, he captured both the heavyweight and overall Amateur Athletic Union National Judo Championships. His very first match was against John Osako, one of the highest ranked judokas at the national level. LeBell earned the upset win via an osaekomi. Afterwards, attracted by better potential earnings and the family's legacy in the business, LeBell transitioned to professional wrestling. Despite his pedigree, he did not get over immediately with audiences but gradually became known for his martial arts background. He eventually adopted the role as "policeman" for the promotion, maintaining law and order, especially during matches involving his brother Mike LeBell. Gene also wrestled under a black mask as The Hangman, teaming up with Roy Staggs.

Milo Savage match
In 1963, LeBell became involved with a challenge by boxer and writer Jim Beck to the practitioners of Japanese martial arts. Beck claimed that a boxer could defeat any martial artist in a straight fight and offered $1000 to anyone who could prove otherwise. Beck engaged in abundant trash-talk, but revealed a very limited knowledge of martial arts, seemingly mistaking judo for karate.

Encouraged by Ed Parker, LeBell accepted the challenge and travelled to Salt Lake City to meet Beck. To his surprise, he learned his opponent would not be Beck but a higher regarded boxer, Milo Savage, who also had a background in amateur wrestling. An agreement was reached for the match to last five rounds, each lasting three minutes. The boxer's side demanded a stipulation in which the smaller and older Savage (Savage was 39 while LeBell was 31 at the date of the fight) could use any type of punch, while the judoka could not kick, in the apparent belief LeBell was a karateka. An additional stipulation prevented LeBell from attempting tackles or takedowns under the waist. In return, Savage offered to wear a judogi. On the day of the match, Savage appeared wearing a karategi instead, much tighter and harder to grab. The Savage camp claimed they did not know the difference. Also, according to LeBell and other sources, Savage's gloves contained brass knuckles and he had greased up his gi with vaseline to make gripping it more difficult. The unusual stipulations convinced LeBell the Savage camp, far from being ignorant about martial arts, had trained Savage in judo in order to defend against LeBell's throws.

The match took place on December 2, 1963. The combatants were initially cautious, with LeBell being the first in pressing the action by attempting to throw Savage down. The boxer blocked the move, which aggravated an old shoulder injury of LeBell. LeBell tried several techniques through the second and third rounds and was finally successful in taking Savage down, but Savage kept defending both standing and on the ground in a very technical manner, seemingly confirming LeBell's theory about his opponent's grappling training. Savage even attempted to sweep the judoka in one instance. Nevertheless, LeBell got mount and found the opportunity to execute an armbar, but he opted instead to seek a choke, concluding that Savage would not surrender to a broken arm. Finally, he performed a left harai goshi in the fourth round and followed by locking a rear naked choke. Within seconds, Savage fell unconscious and LeBell was declared the winner.

The loss by Savage, the hometown favorite, caused the crowd to react violently. Bottles, chairs, and other debris were thrown into the ring. To prevent a full-blown riot, hometown hero and rated professional boxer Jay Fullmer (brother of boxers Gene and Don Fullmer) entered the ring to congratulate LeBell. The judoka and his team showed their sportsmanship by helping to revive Savage using kappo, as neither the referee nor the ring doctor knew how to resuscitate him. Despite this, a man tried to stab LeBell on the way out and the latter had to be protected by the judokas and professional wrestlers who accompanied him.

After retiring
Following his combat sports career, LeBell, along with his brother Mike, ran the National Wrestling Alliance's Los Angeles territory, NWA Hollywood Wrestling, from 1968 to 1982. In June 1976, LeBell refereed the infamous boxing-versus-wrestling contest between Muhammad Ali and Antonio Inoki in Tokyo, Japan. LeBell was selected from over 200 other applicants to referee the bout. He also continued to work in professional wrestling intermittently, wrestling his final match on August 29, 1981, against Peter Maivia for NWA Hollywood Wrestling.

LeBell has opened two martial art schools in cooperation with others and has touted his 1963 match with Milo Savage as the first televised MMA fight in America.  

In 1994, LeBell counted kickboxing champion Benny Urquidez and Brazilian jiu-jitsu practitioners the Machado brothers among his training partners. According to fellow BJJ artist Royce Gracie, LeBell was invited to compete in Ultimate Fighting Championship in early 1995, after Gracie stopped participating in its tournaments. Being 63 years old, LeBell declined to compete or to send a representative, instead suggesting a match against Royce's 82-year-old father, the renowned Hélio Gracie. The latter then accepted, but only if LeBell could drop 100 pounds to reach his weight, otherwise he would have to face Royce's brothers, similarly 20 years younger than LeBell though still lighter than him. Ultimately, nothing came from it.

Along with the awards received for feats in judo and grappling, LeBell was the 2005 recipient of the Frank Gotch Award in celebration of the positive recognition he brought to the sport of wrestling. The Cauliflower Alley Club presented the award. On March 18, 1995, the Cauliflower Alley Club again honored LeBell by presenting him with the "Iron Mike Mazurki" award; presented by one of his teachers, legendary professional wrestling champion Lou Thesz.

Television and film work 
LeBell has worked on over 1,000 films, TV shows and commercials as a stuntman or as an actor (including multiple appearances as himself). LeBell appeared in three Elvis Presley movies as a minor character who starts a fight with the character played by Presley. In addition he also worked on the set of the Green Hornet TV show, in which he developed a friendship with Bruce Lee. Lee was especially interested in exploring grappling with help from him and exchanged ideas on various fighting techniques.

LeBell also appeared in "The World of Martial Arts – Budojujitsu". This 1982 homevideo production, introduced by Chuck Norris and narrated by John Saxon, featured LeBell as a car thief and mugger who (in the prologue) accosts Mitsuru Yamashita and Budojujitsu creator Al Thomas...much to LeBell's regret. The program featured several other martial artists including Graciela Casilas, Karen Sheperd, Victor Ledbetter, Steve Sanders, brothers Benny and Reuben Urquidez, and Dave Vaden.

On March 23, 1991, LeBell was awarded the Honorary "Reel" Membership by the Ring of Friendship of the Cauliflower Alley Club. This award is only given to a select few. Others awarded have been James Cagney, Kirk Douglas, Karl Malden, Cesar Romero, Mickey Rooney, and Sylvester Stallone (movie stars that also did boxing and wrestling).

Conflict with Steven Seagal
While serving as stunt coordinator for the film Out for Justice, starring Steven Seagal, Seagal stated that due to his aikido training he was 'immune' to being choked unconscious. It has been alleged that at some point LeBell heard about the claim and gave Seagal the opportunity to prove it. LeBell is said to have placed his arms around Seagal's neck, and once Seagal said "go", proceeded to choke him unconscious, with Seagal losing control of his bowels.

The popularity of this incident led LeBell to be counted in 1992 as a potential additional member of Robert Wall's controversial "Dirty Dozen," a group of martial artists willing to answer to a public challenge made by Seagal.

LeBell was requested to confirm the story publicly in an interview with Ariel Helwani in 2012, but he avoided answering the question, albeit implying that the incident was true. He was quoted as saying: "When we had a little altercation or difference of opinion, there were thirty stuntmen and cameramen that were watching. Sometimes Steven has a tendency to cheese off the wrong people, and you can get hurt doing that." After being asked whether he was not going to directly confirm it, LeBell said: "Well, if thirty people are watching, let them talk about it."

When Seagal was asked about the incident, he denied the incident took place, calling LeBell a "sick, pathological scumbag liar" and offered the name of a witness who could discredit the other account. LeBell's trainee Ronda Rousey, assured Seagal was the one lying and said: "If [Seagal] says anything bad about Gene to my face, I'd have to make him crap his pants a second time."

Seagal bodyguard and stuntman Steven Lambert, stated he was present and said that a confrontation did happen. According to Lambert, Seagal explained to LeBell that he did not believe his choke hold was effective, and that he could escape from it. LeBell demonstrated the choke hold by putting it on Seagal. Before LeBell could lock the hold, however, Seagal side stepped and swung his forearm backwards into his crotch. LeBell came off the floor by a few feet. As soon as he landed, LeBell used a foot sweep to sweep Seagal off the floor, with Seagal landing on his back. LeBell helped Seagal up.

Teaching
LeBell has earned himself the nicknames "Judo" Gene LeBell, "the Godfather of Grappling" and also "the toughest man alive" for his participation in combat sports. In addition to his judo background, LeBell has an extensive background in submission grappling and catch wrestling, and has trained under Lou Thesz, Karl Gotch and Ed "Strangler" Lewis. He has trained with or taught grappling skills to many well-known wrestlers and martial artists, such as Benny "The Jet" Urquidez, Bob Wall, Chuck Norris, Ed Parker, Gokor Chivichyan, Karo Parisyan, "Rowdy" Roddy Piper, Mando Guerrero, Manny Gamburyan.

The pink colored judo gi became a trademark of LeBell and was a result of a laundry mixup while preparing for a competition in Japan. A pair of red shorts were mixed into the laundry that contained his Gi and turned the uniform a shade of pink. He was set to compete the following day and being a Saturday evening when he received the now colored uniform, he had to compete in the pink uniform. This set the Japanese crowd livid, as it was considered very insulting, but they somewhat calmed down after LeBell went on to win his division.

LeBell is associated with Gokor Chivichyan's Hayastan MMA Academy where he taught grappling classes. He also did interviews for magazines, newspapers, and radio. LeBell judged fights for several decades, but retired from it after Golden Boy Promotions: Liddell vs. Ortiz 3 on November 24, 2018.

LeBell was friends with world champion judoka AnnMaria De Mars, and had known her daughter, Olympic judoka, mixed martial artist and professional wrestler Ronda Rousey since her birth. He was seen in Rousey's corner during matches and celebrated her victories with her.

Legal issues
LeBell was arrested, charged with, and tried for the July 1976 murder of private investigator Robert Duke Hall. He was acquitted of the murder charge but convicted as an accessory for driving the convicted murderer, pornographer Jack Ginsburgs, to and from the murder scene. LeBell's conviction for being an accessory was later overturned by the California Courts of Appeal.

LeBell and Ginsburgs were former friends and business partners of Hall. Inside Hall's residence police discovered hours of wire-tapped recordings, some of which led to the resignation of the Beverly Hills police department chief of police. Other recordings discovered had ties to the presidential campaign of Richard Nixon.

Death 
On August 9, 2022, LeBell died in his sleep.

Works
LeBell authored at least twelve books, including:
 The Handbook of Judo: An Illustrated Step-by-Step Guide to Winning Sport Judo by Gene LeBell and Lauri C. Coughran. 1962, 1963, 1969, 1971, 1975, 1996.
 Your Personal Handbook of Self-defense by Gene LeBell. 1964, 1976.
 Judo and Self-defense for the Young Adult by Gene LeBell. 1971.
 Pro-Wrestling Finishing Holds by "Judo" Gene LeBell. 1985, 1990.
 Grappling Master: Combat for Street Defense and Competition by Gene LeBell. 1992.
 Gene LeBell's Handbook of Self-Defense by Gene LeBell. 1996.
 Gene LeBell – The Grappling Club Master by Gene LeBell, Ben Springer, and Steve Kim. 1999.
 Grappling and Self-Defense for the Young Adult by Gene LeBell and Bob Ryder. 2002.
 How to Break Into Pro Wrestling: "Judo" Gene LeBell's Insider Guide to the Biz by Gene Lebell and Mark Jacobs. 2003.
 Gene LeBell's Grappling World: The Encyclopedia of Finishing Holds by Gene LeBell. 1998, 2000(2nd expanded edition), 2005(3rd edition).
 The Godfather of Grappling (authorised biography of LeBell) by "Judo" Gene LeBell, Bob Calhoun, George Foon, and Noelle Kim. 2005.

Championships and accomplishments

Judo
Amateur Athletic Union
AAU National Judo Championship (1954)
AAU National Judo Championship (1955)

Professional wrestling
50th State Big Time Wrestling
NWA Hawaii Heavyweight Championship (1 time)
Cauliflower Alley Club
Iron Mike Mazurki Award (1995)
Central States Wrestling
NWA Central States Heavyweight Championship (1 time)
George Tragos/Lou Thesz Professional Wrestling Hall of Fame
Frank Gotch Award (2005)
National Wrestling Alliance
NWA Hall of Fame (Class of 2011)
NWA Hollywood Wrestling
NWA Americas Tag Team Championship (1 time) – with Chino Chou
NWA "Beat the Champ" Television Championship (1 time)
Western States Sports
NWA North American Heavyweight Championship (Amarillo version) (1 time)

Wrestling Observer Newsletter
 Most Obnoxious (1981)

Mixed martial arts record

|-
|Win
|align=center|1–0
|Milo Savage
|Technical Submission (rear naked choke)
|Independent Event
|
|align=center|4
|align=center|n/a
|Salt Lake City, Utah, United States
|

References

Books

External links
 
 USMAF Biography
 Seagal vs LeBell resolved – Fact, Fiction & Eye-Witness Testimony on the Urban Legend

1932 births
2022 deaths
American catch wrestlers
American male judoka
American jujutsuka
American male professional wrestlers
American stunt performers
Sportspeople from Los Angeles
Professional wrestlers from California
Professional wrestling announcers
Professional wrestling promoters
NWA Hollywood Wrestling
20th-century professional wrestlers
NWA "Beat the Champ" Television Champions
NWA Americas Tag Team Champions